The William W. Marsh House in Sycamore, Illinois, the county seat of DeKalb County, has been listed on the National Register of Historic Places since 1978. The 1873 house was home to William W. Marsh, an inventor and is located along Illinois Route 64 as it passes through Sycamore. The Marsh House was built in the Italianate style and contains distinctive Italianate elements such as a cupola, a low pitched roof and eaves supported by corbels.

Notes

National Register of Historic Places in DeKalb County, Illinois
Houses in DeKalb County, Illinois
Sycamore, Illinois
Houses completed in 1873
Houses on the National Register of Historic Places in Illinois